WDPR (88.1 FM) is a non-commercial educational radio station licensed to Dayton, Ohio, carrying a classical music format branded "Discover Classical". Owned by Dayton Public Radio, WDPR's primary signal serves the Dayton metropolitan area. The station's reach is extended via WDPG (88.9 FM) in Greenville and WUSO (89.1 FM) in Springfield. WDPR's studios and transmitter are located in Dayton, while WDPG's transmitter resides in Greenville; WUSO's transmitter is located on the campus of Wittenberg University in Springfield. In addition to a standard analog transmission, WDPR is available online.

History
WDPR signed on in 1985 at 89.5, moving to 88.1 in 1998.  Its original city of license was West Carrollton, Ohio. WDPR's old transmitter at 89.5 only operated at 6,000 watts to protect Louisville's WFPL at nearby 89.3.  Its current transmitter at 88.1 only operates at 600 watts to protect WNAS in New Albany, Indiana; also at 88.1.

WDPG signed on in February 1994.  WDPG went on the air after the demise of the former WGVO (91.9 MHz), which was operated by the Greenville City Schools.

References

External links
Discover Classical

DPR
Classical music radio stations in the United States
Radio stations established in 1986
1986 establishments in Ohio